Peter Hugh Sermanni (born 9 July 1971) is a Scottish former professional footballer who played as a midfielder.

Career
After playing youth football for Celtic Boys Club and Liverpool, Sermanni made his professional senior debut during the 1990–91 season with Clydebank, and later played for Queen of the South, making a total of 92 appearances in the Scottish Football League for both teams. Sermanni later played in Australia for Eastern Suburbs, Blacktown City and Sutherland.

His uncle Tom was also a footballer who moved to Australia, and later became a successful international coach in women's football.

References

1971 births
Living people
Footballers from Glasgow
Scottish footballers
Liverpool F.C. players
Clydebank F.C. (1965) players
Queen of the South F.C. players
Scottish Football League players
Association football midfielders
Scottish expatriate sportspeople in Australia
Scottish expatriate footballers
Expatriate soccer players in Australia
Eastern Suburbs players
Blacktown City FC players
Scottish people of Italian descent
Scottish emigrants to Australia